A frappé coffee, Greek frappé, Nescafé frappé, or just frappé is a Greek iced coffee drink made from instant coffee (generally, spray-dried Nescafé), water, sugar, and milk. The word is often written frappe (without an accent). The frappé was invented through experimentation by Dimitris Vakondios, a Nescafe representative, in 1957 in Thessaloniki. Frappés are among the most popular forms of coffee in Greece and Cyprus and have become a hallmark of postwar outdoor Greek coffee culture.

History
The name frappé comes from French, where it describes drinks chilled with ice. Beginning in the 19th century, a variety of cold coffee drinks named  are documented, some similar to slushes, others more like iced coffee.

A representative of the Nestlé company, Giannis Dritsas, was exhibiting a new product for children, a chocolate beverage produced instantly by mixing it with milk and shaking it in a shaker. Dritsas' employee Dimitris Vakondios was looking for a way to have his usual instant coffee during his break but could not find any hot water, so, he mixed the coffee with cold water and ice cubes in a shaker.

This improvised experiment established the frappé which quickly grew in popularity in Greece. Nestlé capitalized on the drink with intense marketing campaigns in the 1980s that broadened the drink's popularity and left the brand name Nescafé inextricably linked with the frappé. While today the drink is usually simply called a 'frappé' in Greece, in the past it was often called a 'Nescafé frappé'.

Preparation
A frappé can be made with a cocktail shaker or, more commonly today, with an electric milk frother or milkshake machine. First, instant coffee (traditionally Nescafé), sugar (optionally), and a little water are shaken or blended together until a thick foam is made. This is poured into the serving glass and ice cubes, cold water, and, optionally, milk (traditionally evaporated milk) are added to it. The drink is almost always served with a drinking straw, as the thick foam which forms on top is considered unpleasantly bitter by many.

Frothy top 
The spray-dried instant coffee used to make a frappé contains nearly no oil; this allows the frappé's characteristically thick layer of foam to form. Frappé foam is similar to crema, the foam found in espresso, but thicker and longer lasting due to its oilless composition. It is a three-phase colloid of air bubbles, coffee solids, and water. Depending on the initial size of the foam's bubbles, and the frappé's sugar content, water drains from the foam over the course of 2–10 minutes, thickening until it forms a nearly solid foam, which then slowly dissipates. Frappés made with freshly brewed coffee or freeze-dried instant coffee, both of which contain significantly more oils than spray-dried instant coffee, produce only short lived foams. Even the way in which the frappé is prepared can impact the bubbles on top of the coffee. For example, making a frappé by using a handheld shaker produces finer, longer lasting, and more stable bubbles.

Terminology and variations 
In Greece, a frappé is generally ordered by specifying sweetness, and the inclusion of milk if desired. The usual sweetness levels are, for 2 spoonfuls of instant coffee:

  (  'sweet') – 4 spoonfuls sugar
  (  'medium') – 2 spoonfuls sugar
  (  'plain') – no sugar

Milk, usually evaporated milk, is generally not added unless explicitly requested with the phrase  (  'with milk'); it can be explicitly requested without milk  ('without milk').

A frappé with milk is occasionally called  (  'frappé-milk'). Sometimes, particularly in Cyprus, frappés are made with milk instead of water (besides the water used in the foam). At some establishments, particularly beach bars, alcoholic liqueurs such as Kahlúa or Baileys Irish Cream are added to frappés; other restaurants have the option of adding a ball of vanilla ice cream to a frappé instead of milk. Though not technically frappés (since they are not shaken) some variations are stirred with a spoon when a shaker is not available, creating a different texture and taste.

Freddo Espresso and Freddo Cappuccino 

The freddo espresso is a Greek iced espresso which was first made in Athens in 1991 and has grown in popularity since. It is often seen as a "higher quality frappé". The freddo cappuccino is a freddo espresso topped with a cold milk-based foam called .

Outside Greece 
Although frappés are commonly associated with Greece, in recent years their popularity has grown in other nations. Frappés first became broadly known outside of Greece as a result of the 2004 Summer Olympics in Athens, during which many tourists became fond of them and an article in the Los Angeles Times was published about them. Immigrants and tourists in Greece have also helped to take the frappé abroad. Today, local variations of the frappé have become popular in places like Bulgaria, where Coca-Cola is sometimes used instead of water (possibly inspired by Coca-Cola Blāk); Denmark, where milk is used instead of water; and Serbia where frappés (also called , "cold instant coffee") are made with ice cream and whipped cream on top. Other Balkan countries have similar variations to the Greek version, such as Albania. The Albanian version is usually made with water or a milk/water mix and a more bitter coffee.

See also
Beaten coffee
Dalgona coffee
Freddo Espresso
Frappuccino
Frappe (New England)

Bibliography

 Vivian Constantinopoulos, Daniel Young, Frappé Nation, 2006,

References

Greek cuisine
Greek drinks
Greek inventions
Coffee drinks